The Yankee Terminal Radar Approach Control (Yankee TRACON) is a terminal air traffic control center located in Windsor Locks, Connecticut operated by the United States Federal Aviation Administration.

Located at the Bradley International Airport (BDL), Yankee TRACON is a consolidated TRACON responsible for the airspace roughly in a 40-mile radius around BDL at or below 10,000 feet. This airspace includes airports  such as Hartford-Brainard Airport (HFD), Meriden Markham Municipal Airport (MMK), Barnes Municipal Airport (BAF), Westover Metropolitan Airport (CEF), Worcester Regional Airport (ORH), Windham Airport (IJD), Northampton Airport (7B2), Skylark Airpark (7B6), Ellington Airport (7B9), Robertson Field (4B8), and Simsbury Airport (4B9).

Yankee TRACON has five operating radar positions and is staffed with about 31 controllers and three Front Line Managers (supervisors). During calendar year 2008, Yankee TRACON worked 245,000 IFR operations.

References

Aviation in Connecticut
Transportation buildings and structures in Hartford County, Connecticut
Air traffic control centers
Air traffic control in the United States